Daein High School is a private, general boys high-school located in Gongchon-dong, Seo-gu, Incheon, Korea.

School History 
 August 16, 1989 School legally recognized as Daein High School, Foundation President Kim Byeong-Su appointed.
 October 23, 1989 Building construction started of Daein High School
 November 28, 1990 Name change to Daein General High School recognized (6 general grades, 6 business grades)
 March 2, 1991 First admissions (600 students)
 April 13, 1991 Celebration ceremony of school establishment
 August 20, 1991 School change of 6 general grades, 4 business-industrial grades, 2 information processing grades
 September 23, 1996 Name change to Daein High School recognized
 July 6, 2005 Selected as an English training activity-focused school, and construction of an exclusive English area completed

References

External links
Official website

High schools in South Korea
Schools in Incheon
Seo District, Incheon
1991 establishments in South Korea
Educational institutions established in 1991
Boys' schools in South Korea